, also known as ABA, is a Japanese broadcast network affiliated with the ANN. It broadcasts to Aomori Prefecture from studio facilities located in Aomori City.

Headquarters
125-1, Arakawa aza Shibata, Aomori City, Aomori Prefecture, Japan
Telephone Number:+81-17-762-1111

History
October 1, 1991 - Station launch.
July 1, 2006 - Start of digital terrestrial television service (Aomori main station).
July 24, 2011 - All-analogTVstations were abolished.

Stations

Analog stations
Aomori(Main Station) JOAH-TV 34ch
Hachinohe 31ch
Kamikita 57ch
Mutsu 56ch
Owani 24ch
Sannohe-Nanbu 40ch
Asamushi 58ch
Ajigasawa-Akaishi 61ch
Imabetsu 60ch
Odose 22ch
Kasose 40ch
Fukaura 23ch
Fukaura-Chokeidaira 58ch
Fukaura-Henashi 60ch
Nishi-Towada 58ch
Fukaura-Oirase 53ch
Owani-Nijikai 54ch
Ajigasawa-Hitotsumori 55ch
Kodomari 54ch
Nishi-Tsugaru-Maito 58ch
San'nohe-Nango 52ch
Ohata 52ch
Ajigasawa-Nakamura 36ch
Lake Towada 41ch
Hiranai-Uchidoji 39ch
Nagawa-Ken'yoshi 58ch
Hiranai-Yamaguchi 39ch
Hiranai-Sotodoji 39ch

Digital stations(ID:5)
Aomori(Main Station) JOAH-DTV 32ch
Hachinohe 24ch
Kamikita 36ch
Fukaura 36ch
Mutsu 41ch

Programs

Original programs
Super J Channel ABA - from 17:00 until 19:00 on Weekdays
From here Dream Late-night broadcasting LUCKY! - from 24:15 until 24:45 on Fridays
Message - from 9:30 until 9:35 on Saturdays(except to 5thSaturday・Reruns is from 24:15 until 24:20 on Tuesdays.)
From here Dream Live broadcasting HAPPY! - from 9:35 until 10:30 on Saturdays
Tsukaeru-kun no Enetan - from 17:25 until 17:30 on Sundays
ABA News

Syndicated
From TV Tokyo:
Pokémon
Card Fight Vanguard

Rival stations
Aomori Broadcasting Corporation(RAB)
Aomori Television(ATV)
Aomori FM Broadcasting(AFB)

Other links
Asahi Broadcasting Aomori

All-Nippon News Network
Companies based in Aomori Prefecture
Asahi Shimbun Company
Television stations in Japan
Television channels and stations established in 1991
Mass media in Aomori (city)
1991 establishments in Japan